The University of Montevallo Historic District was added to the National Register of Historic Places in December 1978 and originally included 25 acres and 16 structures. These structures made up the core part of the campus and included residence halls, academic buildings, and water towers on campus. The original 16 structures were divided into four categories; Federal Revival style buildings, Greek Revival style buildings, buildings dating from 1897 to 1940, and buildings dating from the 1950s to 1977. In 1990, the Historic District was expanded to include 59 more structures directly surrounding the original Historic District, bringing the total number of structures in the district to 75. The structures added included additional campus buildings, domestic dwellings, a cemetery, and other contributing resources related to the University of Montevallo.

Original historic district

References

External links

 University of Montevallo official website

Greek Revival architecture in Alabama
Historic districts in Shelby County, Alabama
Historic districts on the National Register of Historic Places in Alabama
National Register of Historic Places in Shelby County, Alabama
Neoclassical architecture in Alabama
Historic district